Axiocerses is a genus of butterflies in the family Lycaenidae. The species of this genus are found in the Afrotropical realm.

Species
Axiocerses amanga (Westwood, 1881)
Axiocerses argenteomaculata Pagenstecher, 1902
Axiocerses bambana Grose-Smith, 1900
Axiocerses bamptoni Henning & Henning, 1996
Axiocerses callaghani Henning & Henning, 1996
Axiocerses coalescens Henning & Henning, 1996
Axiocerses collinsi Henning & Henning, 1996
Axiocerses croesus (Trimen, 1862)
Axiocerses harpax (Fabricius, 1775)
Axiocerses heathi Henning & Henning, 1996
Axiocerses jacksoni Stempffer, 1948
Axiocerses karinae Henning & Henning, 1996
Axiocerses kiellandi Henning & Henning, 1996
Axiocerses maureli Dufrane, 1954
Axiocerses melanica Henning & Henning, 1996
Axiocerses nyika Quickelberge, 1984
Axiocerses punicea (Grose-Smith, 1889)
Axiocerses styx Rebel, 1908
Axiocerses susanae Henning & Henning, 1996
Axiocerses tjoane (Wallengren, 1857)

External links
"Axiocerses Hübner, [1819]" at Markku Savela's Lepidoptera and Some Other Life Forms
Royal Museum of Central Africa Images

 
Lycaenidae genera
Taxa named by Jacob Hübner